is the eighth studio album by Japanese singer Yōko Oginome. Released through Victor Entertainment on December 17, 1988, it was Oginome's first English-language album. The album was produced by Narada Michael Walden, who co-wrote the songs with Walter Afanasieff, Jeffrey Cohen, Joyce Imbesi, and Preston Glass. No singles from the album were released, but "Passages of Time" was re-recorded as a single in 1993. Verge of Love was reissued on April 21, 2010 with two bonus tracks as part of Oginome's 25th anniversary celebration.

The album peaked at No. 5 on Oricon's albums chart and at No. 90 on Oricon's 1989 year-ending albums chart. It also sold over 136,000 copies.

Track listing 
All music is arranged by Narada Michael Walden, except where indicated.

Charts
Weekly charts

Year-end charts

Japanese version

The Japanese version of Verge of Love was released on February 21, 1989 as Oginome's ninth studio album. The title track was released as a single on January 18, 1989 and peaked at No. 5 on Oricon's singles chart. The album was reissued on April 21, 2010 with one bonus track as part of Oginome's 25th anniversary celebration.

The album peaked at No. 11 on Oricon's albums chart and sold over 52,000 copies.

Track listing

Charts

Personnel
 Walter Afanasieff – keyboards, synthesizers, drum programming
 David Sancious – keyboards, synthesizer
 Rem Klyce – synthesizer
 Randy Jackson – synthesizer, bass
 Joyce Imbesi – piano
 Corrado Rustici – guitars
 Vernon "Ice" Black – rhythm guitar
 Chris Camozzi – rhythm guitar
 Alan Glass – rhythm guitar
 Bob Castell – rhythm guitar
 Joy Julks – bass
 Narada Michael Walden – drums
 Greg "Gigi" Gonaway – cymbals
 Michael Carabello – congas, percussion
 Bongo Bob Smith – percussion programming
 Premik Russell Tubbs – flute, tenor saxophone
 Kitty Beethoven – backing vocals
 Pride & Joy – backing vocals
 Claytoven Richardson – backing vocals
 Jennifer Hall – backing vocals
 Jim Gilstrap – backing vocals
 Kevin "Stone Jam" Dorsey – backing vocals
 Carolyn Hedrich – backing vocals
 Carla Vaughn – backing vocals
 Kelly Kool – backing vocals

Cover versions
D'atra Hicks covered "Something About You" in her 1989 self-titled debut album.

References

External links
  (English version)
  (Japanese version)
 
 
 
 

1988 albums
1989 albums
Yōko Oginome albums
Albums produced by Narada Michael Walden
English-language Japanese albums
Japanese-language albums
Victor Entertainment albums